The National College Entrance Examination (NCEE), commonly known as the gaokao, is a standardized college entrance exam held annually in mainland China. It is required for entrance into almost all higher education institutions at the undergraduate level, including for short cycle (2 year) and long cycle (4 year) degree programs. It is usually taken by students in their third and last year of senior high school, but the age requirement was abolished in 2001.

The exams last about nine hours over a period of two or three days, depending on the province in which it is held. The Standard Chinese language and mathematics are included in all tests. Candidates can choose one subject from English, French, Japanese, Russian, German or Spanish for the foreign language portion of the test, with most students selecting English. In most regions, students must also choose between either the liberal-arts-oriented concentration or the natural-science-oriented concentration. Students who choose the liberal arts receive further testing in history, political science, and geography, while those who choose natural sciences are tested in physics, chemistry, and biology.

The overall mark received by the student is generally a weighted sum of their subject marks. The maximum possible mark varies widely from year to year and from province to province.

Generally, the modern College Entrance Examination takes place from June 7 to 8 every year, though in some provinces it can last for an extra day. On rare occasions, it has been delayed, most notably due to COVID-19.

History

Background 
The first gaokao was held on August 15–17, 1952.

The unified national tertiary entrance examination marked the start of reform of National Matriculation Tests Policies (NMTP) in the newly established People's Republic of China. With the implementation of the first Five Year Plan in 1953, the NMTP was further enhanced. After repeated discussions and experiments, the NMTP was eventually set as a fundamental policy system in 1959. From 1958, the tertiary entrance examination system was affected by the Great Leap Forward Movement. Unified recruitment was soon replaced by separate recruitment by individual or allied tertiary education institutions. Meanwhile, political censorship on candidate students was enhanced. Since 1962, criticism of the NMTP system due to its negative impact on the working class. On July 1966, the NMTP was officially canceled and substituted with a new admission policy of recommending workers, farmers and soldiers to college. During the next ten years, the Down to the Countryside Movement, initiated by Mao Zedong, forced both senior and junior secondary school graduates, the so-called "intellectual youths", to work as farmers in countryside villages. Against the backdrop of world revolution, millions of such young people joined the ranks of farmers, working and living alongside them.

In the early 1970s, Mao Zedong resumed the operation of universities. However, new students were selected through evaluation by a revolutionary committee rather than through formal academic scores. This practice continued until the death of Mao in September 1976. In late 1977, Deng Xiaoping, then under Hua Guofeng, the heir apparent of Mao, officially resumed traditional examinations based on academics, the National Higher Education Entrance Examination, which has continued to the present day.

The first such examination after the Cultural Revolution took place in late 1977. There was no limit on the age or official educational background of examinees. Consequently, most of the hopefuls who had accumulated during the ten years of the Cultural Revolution and many others who simply wanted to try their luck took the examination. The youngest were in their early teens and the oldest were in their late thirties. Exam questions were designed by individual provinces. In 1977, the total number of candidate students for the national college entrance exam was as many as 5.7 million. Although the Ministry of Education eventually expanded enrollment, adding 63,000 more to the admission quota, the admission rate of 4.8% was the lowest in the history of the PRC, with only 272,971 students being admitted.

Starting from 1978, the examination was uniformly designed by the Ministry of Education and all the students across the country took identical examinations.

However, reforms on the content and structure of the exam persisted, with one of the most salient issues being agency for individual provinces to customize their own exams. The Ministry of Education allowed the College Enrollment Office of Shanghai to employ an independent exam in 1985, which was the beginning of provincial proposition. In the same year, Guangdong was permitted to adopt independent proposition. Beginning from 2003, Beijing, Tianjin, Jiangsu, and Zhejiang were allowed to adopt independent propositions. Since then, 16 provinces and municipalities have adopted customized exams.

Although today's admission rate is much higher than in 1977, 1978 and before the 1990s, it is still fairly low compared to the availability of higher education in the Western world. Consequently, the examination is highly competitive, causing prospective examinees and their families to experience enormous pressure. For the majority of examinees, the exam is a watershed that divides two dramatically different lives.

In 1970, less than 1% of Chinese people had attended higher education, and less than 1/1000 of the population of China was admitted to universities. In the 1970s, 70% of students who were recommended to attend university had political backgrounds reflecting the political nature of university selection at the time. At the same time, the undergraduate course system reduced the time from 4 years to 3 years. According to incomplete statistics, from 1966 to 1977, institutions of higher learning recruited 940,000 people who belonged to the worker-peasant-soldier group.

For most provinces, the National Higher Education Entrance Examination is held once a year; however, some provinces hold examinations twice a year, with the additional exam referred to as the Spring Entrance Examination. Prior to 2003, the National Higher Education Entrance Examination took place in July every year. It now takes place every June. Partial Provincial administrative units determine the schedule of the exams on the 7th and 8 June. Prior to 2003, the examination was held in July, but has since been moved to the month of June. This move was made in consideration of the adverse effects of hot weather on students living in southern China and possible flooding during the rainy season in July.

2006 gaokao 
In 2006, a record high of 9.5 million people applied for tertiary education entry in China. Of these, 8.8 million (93%) took the national entrance exam and 27,600 (0.28%) were exempted if the students demonstrate exceptional merit in the quality of their work and understanding of the academic subject. Everyone else (700,000 students) took other standardized entrance exams, such as those designed for adult education students.

2017 gaokao 
In 2017, 9.40 million students took the gaokao, 7 million of whom were admitted into colleges and/or universities.  The percentage of first-class admission (Yi Ben (一本)), deemed as good universities in China) varied from 9.48% to 30.5%, with the lowest admission rates in Henan province and Shanxi province, at less than 10%.

Below are the changes of the exam scope in 2017 (in most areas of China, where the students use the Nationwide Exam Papers in gaokao):

Chinese

 All the exam contents are set into compulsory examination scope.

Mathematics

 Elective Course 4-1 (Selection of Geometric Proof) is removed from the elective examination scope.

Foreign Language

 No changes.

Physics

 Elective Course 3-5 is changed from the elective examination scope into the compulsory examination scope.

Chemistry

 Elective Course 2 (Chemistry and Technology) is removed from the elective examination scope.

Biology

 Topic 3 (Tissue Culture Technology of Plants) is removed from the elective examination scope of Elective Course 1 (Biotechnology Practice).

Politics

 No changes.

History

 Elective Course 2 (Democratic Thought and Practice in Modern Society) is removed from the elective examination scope.

Geography

 Elective Course 5 (Natural Disasters and Prevention) is removed from the elective examination scope.

2018 gaokao 
9.75 million students attended gaokao on June 7 and 8.

Acceptance rate for each year 

The number of higher education institutes in the People's Republic of China has risen annually since 1977. From 1999 to 2020, the number of institutes increased dramatically from 1,071 to 2,740, which significantly contributed to the rapid growth in the number of NCEE examinees and accepted students.

Subjects before NCEE Reform
The subjects tested in the National Higher Education Entrance Examination have changed over time. Traditionally, students would undertake either a set of "liberal-art" subjects or a set of "science" subjects, with some shared compulsory subjects which were Chinese, mathematics and a foreign language. The subjects taken in the Examination affected the degree Examination, or implemented flexible systems for selecting the subjects to be tested, resulting in a number of different systems. But things are changing. A reform was announced in and begun from 2014 and will be completed by 2025.

"3+X" system
As a pilot examination system used in order to promote education system reform, this examination system has been implemented in most parts of the country, including Beijing City, Tianjin City, Hebei Province, Liaoning Province, Jilin Province, Heilongjiang Province, Anhui Province, Fujian Province, Guangdong Province, Jiangxi Province, Henan Province, Shandong Province, Hubei Province, Shaanxi Province, Sichuan Province, Guizhou Province, Yunnan Province, Shanxi Province, Chongqing City, Gansu Province, Qinghai Province, Inner Mongolia, Guangxi, Ningxia, Xinjiang and Tibet. In the context of the reform of the National College Entrance Examination, this program will be suspended in Beijing, Tianjin, Shandong and Hainan provinces from 2020, and will be suspended in most provinces and cities in China from 2021. It will cease across Mainland China by 2022.

"3" refers to compulsory subjects, including "Chinese, Mathematics and a foreign language", each of which accounts for 150/750 in total score.
"X" means that students can choose, according to their own capability, one subject from either Social Sciences (including Political Sciences, History and Geography), or Natural Sciences (including Physics, Chemistry and Biology), which accounts for 300/750 in total score.
If a student chooses Natural Sciences, then he or she will take a relatively harder mathematics test as well, including Curves and Equations, Space Vector and Solid Geometry, The Concept of Definite Integral, Fundamental Theorem of Calculus, Simple Application of Definite Integral, Mathematical Induction, Counting Principle, Random Variable and Its Distribution.
For candidates of minor ethnic groups in Tibet, Xinjiang, Inner Mongolia, Qinghai and Jilin, their Literature score consists of an easier Chinese Literature test and an optional subject on Tibetan, Mongolian, Uyghur and Korean Literature, each counting for 75 points.

Region specific

"3+X+Y" system
The system was used in Zhejiang Province, with the last exam offered in 2016 to "Class-of-2013" (Chinese: 2013级, meaning admitted to senior high school in 2013, i.e., being Grade 10 in 2013) while "Class-of-2014" students have been taking the reformed version of Gaokao since 2017.

The "3" and "X" are the same as the national "3+X" system, weighed 750 points. The "Y" part consists of 18 problems, covering 9 subjects (Chinese, Maths, English, Physics, Chemistry, Biology, History, Politics, and Geography), from which students need to choose 6 problems to answer, weighed 60 points. The total score is 810 points.

"3+2" system
This system used to be employed in Jiangsu Province, but is being replaced by another system in 2020. The total score was 480 points.

"3" refers to three compulsory subjects "Chinese, mathematics and a foreign language", which are recorded in the total score.
"2" refers to selecting two subjects either from Politics, History or Geography for arts students, or from Biology, Chemistry or Physics for science students, which are not recorded in total score but a class like A, B, etc. will be recorded.
 Bonus Points: refers to 4 comprehensive science or liberal arts exams, one gets a bonus of 5 points if they get 4 "A"s in all 4 elective exams.

"4+X" system
This system was used after the New Curriculum Reform being employed in Guangdong province, and now it has been abandoned.
"X" means that according to their own interests, candidates can choose one or two subjects either from arts subjects, including Politics, History and Geography (Politics and Geography cannot be chosen simultaneously), or from science subjects, including Biology, Physics and Chemistry (Physics and Biology cannot be chosen simultaneously).
Chinese and a foreign language are compulsory. Two separate Mathematics tests are designed respectively for arts students and science students.
In addition to three compulsory subjects and X subject, arts students have to take comprehensive tests of arts, and science students have to take comprehensive tests of science.

"3+1+X" system
This system has been implemented in Shanghai since the employment of comprehensive courses, now abandoned.
"3" refers to three compulsory subjects "Chinese, Mathematics and a foreign language", with 150 scores for each subject.
"1" refers to one subject that candidates choose according to their own interests and specialty from "Politics, History, Geography, Physics, Chemistry and Biology". This subject accounts 150 scores when admitted by universities and colleges at undergraduate level. The score is not included in the total score when admitted by vocational and technical colleges. Therefore, candidates can give up this subject when applying for colleges at vocational and technical level.
"X" refers to comprehensive ability test, which is categorized into arts tests and science tests. Arts students can either choose one subject from Politics, History and Geography, or take an arts comprehensive test when giving up "1' subject. Science students can either choose one subject from Physics, Chemistry and Biology, or take a science comprehensive test when giving up "1" subject. Regardless of arts and science categories, all the comprehensive ability tests cover knowledge of six subjects,including Politics, History, Geography, Physics, Chemistry and Biology. In the first volume of the arts test, number of questions related to arts subjects exceeds science questions, and vice versa; the second volume of the two tests are the same.

"3+2+X" system
This is a pilot college entrance examination system implemented by the Jiangsu Province in 2003 after examining other testing systems, but it was replaced by "3+2" system in 2008. Subject tests will take turns into the embrace of National Standard. A new policy substituted the old one in 2021.

"3" refers to three compulsory subjects "Chinese, mathematics and a foreign language", which are recorded in the total score.
"2" refers to choosing two subjects from the following six areas "politics, history, geography, physics, chemistry, biology", which are not recorded in total score but a class like A+, A, etc. will be recorded.
"X" refers to a comprehensive science or liberal arts exam, which is not recorded in the total score, only for university admission reference.

"3+X+1" system
This is part of the curriculum reform in China.
"3" refers to Chinese, Mathematics and a foreign language, which are compulsory testing subjects for each candidate.
"X" means choosing one of the two comprehensive tests in either sciences or liberal arts, according to the student's interest. The "3" and "X" are the same as the national "3+X" system.
"1" refers to a basic proficiency test on skills (基本能力测试) that high school graduates needs and should have in order to adapt to social life. This college entrance examination system was implemented for the first time in Shandong in 2007 and ended in 2014.
 The examination system in Shandong Province reverted to the "3+X" system as of the most recent testing in June 2014 and took the reform plan from 2020.

Reform of the National College Entrance Examination

"3+1+2" system
This system was first introduced in 2019, when Hebei Province, Liaoning Province, Jiangsu Province, Fujian Province, Hubei Province, Hunan Province, Guangdong Province, Chongqing City announced their examination reform plan, and performed on the 2018 students. This system gives students a wider choice on what subjects they are being tested on comparing to "3+X" system, but limits students' choice against the "3+3" system. By 2024, most regions of the country would implement the system as the successor of their "3+X" system.

"3" refers to compulsory subjects, including "Chinese, Mathematics and a foreign language", each of which accounts for 150/750 in total score.
"1" refers to a selection between Physics and History, which accounts 100/750 in total score.
"2" refers to two subjects that candidates choose according to their own interests and specialty from Chemistry, Biology, Politics and Geography. This test was renamed as Grading Exam of the Academic Proficiency Examination for Senior High School Students (普通高中学业水平等级性考试) as these exams are held per region, unlike the compulsory courses which are held nationally by the Ministry of Education.

To promise the legitimacy of the Grading Exam courses, the final scores of the four courses were transferred to band scores before they were counted into the total score. Example below is Guangdong's algorithm.

When weighing the score, the candidate's score of one course are sorted from high to low, and divided into five group according to rank distribution. A grade from A to E was given to these groups. The band score is then calculated after confirming the grade.

The band score has a range from 100 to 30, each grade has a typical range of 10pts to 17pts. According to each candidate's actual score, the score's belonging grade, and the grade's scoring range, the score was transferred in proportion by the following formula:

"3+3" system 
This system has been implemented in Shanghai and Zhejiang since the employment of comprehensive courses since September 2014. Since 2017, Beijing, Tianjin, Shandong, Hainan have begun to use this program.

 The first "3" stands for three compulsory courses, including Chinese, mathematics, and a foreign language (a choice of one from English, Japanese, Russian, German, French, Spanish). 
 The second "3" stands for three selective courses which depends on students' choice from physics, chemistry, biology, technology (Zhejiang only), geography, politics and history. Like above, this test was renamed as Grading Exam of the Academic Proficiency Examination for Senior High School Students (普通高中学业水平等级性考试).
 Originally, the initial intention of the reform was to let students develop their strengths and avoid their weaknesses; however, students taking the exam rushed to test into subjects that were perceived as higher-scoring. This has resulted in very few people entering into certain subjects, such as physics.
 In the calculation of the scores of the other, 70 points (in Shanghai) or 100 points (in Zhejiang) for each of the subjects, according to the levels like A+, A, B+, ..., D, E, etc (Divided into 21 grades in Zhejiang, 11 in Shanghai; 3 points between every two grades). According to the published news, Beijing and Tianjin indicated that their plan is similar to the Zhejiang plan, and Anhui's request for comment is similar to Zhejiang, too; Shandong is divided into eight grades of A, B+, B, C+, C, D+, D, and E. According to the original scores and equal conversion rules of the candidates, they are converted to 91-100, 81-90, 71-80, 61-70, 51-60, 41-50, 31-40, 21-30 eight score intervals, get the grades of candidates.'
 Another concern is that candidates who want to take the college entrance examination must first take the Qualifying Exam of the Academic Proficiency Examination for Senior High School Students (普通高中学业水平合格性考试),  which results are credited as "qualified" and "failed".

<noinclude>

Procedure
The National Higher Education Entrance Examination is not uniform across the country, but administered uniformly within each province of China or each direct-controlled municipality. The National Higher Education Entrance Examination is graded variously across the country.

Before the examination
In the winter of the year before the examination year, students are required to register for the examination. The registration is usually completed on the official website of the provincal academy of educational recruitment and examination, and examinees are required to fill out an online form, which includes name, gender, date of birth, identification number, address, domicile, political status, school, phone number, and other informations about the examination and admission. The form requires students to choose elective-mandatory subjects they elected. Three subjects are universally mandatory: Chinese, Mathematics, and a foreign language — usually English, but this may be substituted by Russian, Japanese, German, French or Spanish, less than 1% students substitute by other languages. The other six standard subjects are three natural-science subjects - physics, chemistry, biology, and three liberal-art subjects - history, geography, and political science; applicants can elect 3 subjects to take tests from them. Six subjects students take test in Gaokao consist of three universally mandatory subjects and three elective-mandatory subjects which was chosen by applicants.

However, there are general requirements examinees have to comply with:
 Abide by the Constitution and laws of the People's Republic of China.
 Have a high school diploma or equivalent.
 Be in good health.
 Have read carefully and are willing to abide by the rules of the Register and other regulations and policies of the Institutions of Higher Learning and the Office of Admissions Committee about the enrollment management.
 If foreign immigrants who settle down in China conform to the enlists condition of the National Higher Education Entrance Examination, they can then apply for the National Higher Education Entrance Examination with the foreign immigrants' resident certificate, which are sent by the Provincial Public Security Department at the location that is assigned.
 If willing to apply for the Military Academy: students who are graduating this year and have studied in high school for the first time cannot be older than 20 years of age and unmarried; if willing to apply for the Police Academy: students who are graduating this year and have studied in high school for the first time cannot be older than 22 years of age and unmarried; if willing to apply for the foreign language major in Police Academy: students who are graduating this year and have studied in high school for the first time cannot be older than 20 years of age and unmarried.
 If students from Juvenile Classes want to take the National Higher Education Entrance Examination, their schools need to pre-select, send a certification of approval, inform the exact required courses, and clarify the offices of Admissions Committee where they will take the National Higher Education Entrance Examination. After doing so, the students can then file the application. After the Office of Admissions Committee reviews and approves, the students can apply for and attend the National Higher Education Entrance Examination at the correct location. Students who apply for Shao Nian Ban must be part of a small percentage of the population. They must have very high IQ, their grades must be excellent, and they must study at a secondary or high school under the age of 15 (excluding those who are graduating this year and have studied in high school for the first time).

The following groups are prohibited from taking the exam:
 Students who are currently studying in higher education.
 Students whose files are incomplete, such as those with no school status.
 One who is serving a prison sentence or is being prosecuted for violating Criminal Law of the People's Republic of China.

In the spring before Gaokao, examinees participate in school-organized medical examinations, in order to find diseases affect future majors. For example, students with myopia are not allowed to apply for military schools, and colorblind students won't be admitted by medical professions. It is also noting that "have a high school diploma or equivalent" requires students to firstly take Qualifying Examination of the Academic Proficiency Examination for Senior High School Students (普通高中学业水平合格性考试), unofficially called "Huikao (会考)", including 12 subjects students learned in senior high school. The examination are always very simple to pass. Their results are credited as "qualified" and "failed", "qualified" accounts for 97% of the total number of examination and "failed" accounts 3% of the total, in the end hand in a Comprehensive Qualification Report based on the student's performance and social activity. The result of the Qualifying Examination and the Report would be given to the college as a reference when admitting. Failed students have three chances to take makeup examinations. Chemistry, biology, geography and history examinations are held in the summer of senior one; Chinese, mathematics, English, physics, politics examinations took places in the winter of senior two; and information technology and general technology examinations took up in the summer of senior two; physical education test is in the spring of senior three-months before Gaokao. Elective subjects they failed in Huikao are not available for applicants when signing upto Gaokao.

Examination
It is arranged at the end of the spring semester and secondary school graduates across the country take the examination simultaneously over a two to four-day period.

Admission
Applicants to some specialist programs are also screened by additional criteria: some art departments (e.g. audition), military and police schools (political screening and physical exam), and some sports programs (tryout).

Exam scores can be used to apply to universities outside mainland China. Across the globe, Hong Kong is on their top list. In 2007, 7 students with the overall highest score in their provinces entered Hong Kong's universities rather than the two major universities in mainland China. In 2010, over 1,200 students entered the 12 local institutions which provide tertiary education courses through this examination. In addition, City University of Hong Kong and Chinese University of Hong Kong directly participate in the application procedure like other mainland universities.

The examination is essentially the only criterion for tertiary education admissions. Poor test performance almost always means giving up on that goal. Students hoping to attend university will spend most of their waking moments studying prior to the exam. If they fail in their first attempt, some students repeat the last year of high school to retake the exam during the following year.

In different places and across different time periods in history, students were required to apply for their intended university or college prior to the exam, after the exam, or more recently, after they receive their scores, by filling a list of ranked preferences. The application list is classified into several tiers (including at least early admissions, key universities, regular universities, vocational colleges), each of which can contain around 4-6 choices for institutions and programs. Typically, an institution or program would only admit students who apply to it as their first choice in each tier. In some regions, students are allowed to apply for different tiers at different times. For example, in Shanghai, students apply for early admission, key universities and regular universities prior to the exam, but can apply for other colleges after they receive their scores.

Criticisms

Regional discrimination
A university usually sets a fixed admission quota for each province, with a higher number of students coming from its home province. As the advanced educational resources (number and quality of universities) are distributed unevenly across China, it is argued that people are being discriminated against during the admission process based on their geographic region. For example, compared to Beijing, Jiangxi province has fewer universities per capita. Therefore, Jiangxi usually receives fewer admission quotas compared with Beijing, which makes a significantly higher position among applicants necessary for a Jiangxi candidate to be admitted by the same university than their Beijing counterpart. The unequal admission schemes for different provinces and regions might intensify competition among examinees from provinces with fewer advanced education resources. For example, Peking University planned to admit 800 science students from Beijing (with 80,000 candidates in total), but only 38 from Shandong (with 660,000 candidates in total). This is not similar to the practice of regional universities in other countries which receive subsidies from regional governments in addition to or in place of those received from central governments, as universities in China largely depend on state budget rather than local budget. However, this regionally preferential policy does provide subsidies to minority students from under-developed regions that enjoy limited educational resources, such as Tibet and Xinjiang.

The regional discrimination can be proved by the disparities between ratios of a province's enrollment of students to the total number of candidate students of the province. In 2010, the acceptance rates for students from Beijing, Shanghai, Shandong and Henan who applied for universities of the first-ranking category were 20.1%, 18%, 7.1% and 3.5% respectively. High acceptance rates are likely to appear in the most and least developed cities and provinces, such as Beijing, Shanghai or Qinghai. In contrast, acceptance rates remain relatively equal among provinces of the average developmental level.

In recent years, varied admission standards have led some families to relocate for the sole purpose of advancing their children's chances of entering university.

In addition, regional discrimination is not only restricted to the ratio for admission. This is best illustrated with an example of the Hubei Province, where students' exam scores have been higher than other provinces for a long time. A score for a Hubei student to just reach the admission cut-off line for a key university may be enough for a student from another province to be admitted by a much better university, and even enough for a Beijing student to be admitted by top universities like Tsinghua University and Peking University.

Some local students in Hong Kong complained that it was unfair that the increasing intake of Mainland students who have performed at a high level in this examination increases the admission grades of universities, making it harder for local students to get admission. In 2010, more than 5,000 out of the 17,000 students who achieved the minimum university entry requirement were not offered places in any degree courses in the UGC-funded universities.

Migrant children
As a student is required to take exams in the region where their household registration (under the Hukou system) is located, the qualification of migrant children becomes controversial. Since 2012, some regions began to relax the requirements and allow some children of migrants to take their College Entrance Exam in regions outside of their household registration. As of 2016, Guangdong's policies are the most relaxed. A child of migrants can take their Entrance Exam in Guangdong if they have attended 3 years of highschool in the province, and if the parent(s) have legal jobs and have paid for 3 years of social insurance in the province.

Special concessions
There are special concessions for members of ethnic minorities, foreign nationals, persons with family origin in Taiwan, and children of military casualties. Students can also receive bonus marks by achieving high results in academic Olympiads, other science and technology competitions, sporting competitions, as well as "political or moral" distinction. In the 2018 National People's Congress, the government passed legislation abolishing all bonus scores from competitions.

Psychological pressure

Because gaokao is one of the most influential examinations in China and students can only take the test once a year, both teachers and students undergo tremendous pressure in preparing for and taking the exam. For teachers, because the society heavily focuses on the rate of admission into universities, they have to work harder to prepare every student for the exam. Because of this, teachers give students more and more practice for exams. This teaching methodology, colloquially referred to as "cramming", involves students memorizing large volumes of information fed to them by teachers and undertaking many practice exercises in order to optimize exam writing ability. One of the disadvantages of this method is the lack of focus on teaching critical thinking and ignoring students' emotions, values and personalities. Many examinees suffer from severe anxiety during the test. In some cases, examinees may faint in the examination room.

Further and deeper stemming criticisms have been leveled that the testing system is the "most pressure packed examination in the world". Behaviors surrounding the testing period have been extreme under some reports, with doctors in Tianjin purportedly prescribing birth control pills to female students whose parents wanted to ensure the girls were not menstruating at the time of examination.  Testing pressure, for some critics, has been linked to faintings, increased drop out rates, and even increasing rates of teenage clinical depression.

Pressure caused as a result of the gaokao has been linked to a rise in student suicides. A school in Hebei province installed suicide barriers to prevent students from jumping to their deaths in response to two suicides in the facility related to the exam.

Impact
The gaokao tends to impact the lives of most Chinese teenagers and their parents. In Zhengzhou, Henan, the local bus company parked a 985 number bus outside a gaokao center for parents to wait in, the number reflects a popular enrollment program number for university entrances.

See also
Education in China
Hong Kong Diploma of Secondary Education
Higher education in China
List of admission tests to colleges and universities
List of universities in China
JEE-Main
Suneung

References

Further reading
 Yu, Lan and Hoi K. Suen (Pennsylvania State University). "Historical and Contemporary Exam-driven Education Fever in China" (Archive). KEDI Journal of Educational Policy Vol.2 No.1 2005 17-33.

External links
 Szekely, E. (2023). The National College Entrance Examination in China (Gaokao): A Discreet Driver for Global Social Change In: The Palgrave Handbook of Global Social Change. Palgrave Macmillan, Cham. https://doi.org/10.1007/978-3-030-87624-1_244-1
Ministry of Education
Test Fever China Today, 2005. 
"China's SAT". Slate, June 4, 2008.
National University Entrance Examination for China, Ji-heng Zhang Translator, Harry Manos, The Physics Teacher March 1994—Volume 32, Issue 3, pp. 187–189
China Prep PBS documentary on students preparing for China's National Higher Education Entrance Exam

Academic pressure in East Asian culture
Higher education in China
School examinations
Standardised tests in China
1952 introductions